Vadim Paireli (born 8 November 1995) is a Moldovan footballer who plays as an attacking midfielder for Sfîntul Gheorghe.

Club career
On 28 January 2021, Paireli left Sheriff Tiraspol to sign for Armenian club FC Noah. Paireli left Noah on 24 December 2021 after his contract expired. He joined Sfîntul Gheorghe in February 2022.

International career
He was a member of the Moldova under-19 team and Moldova under-21 team. He made his debut for the senior squad on 9 October 2017 in a World Cup qualifier against Austria.

References

External links
Vadim Paireli at Footballdatabase

1995 births
Living people
People from Tiraspol
Moldovan footballers
Moldova youth international footballers
Moldova under-21 international footballers
Moldova international footballers
Association football midfielders
FC Sheriff Tiraspol players
NK Dugopolje players
CS Petrocub Hîncești players
FC Sfîntul Gheorghe players
FC Dinamo-Auto Tiraspol players
FC Noah players
Moldovan Super Liga players
First Football League (Croatia) players
Armenian Premier League players
Moldovan expatriate footballers
Expatriate footballers in Croatia
Moldovan expatriate sportspeople in Croatia
Expatriate footballers in Armenia
Moldovan expatriate sportspeople in Armenia